Pope County is  the southeasternmost county in the U.S. state of Illinois.  According to the 2020 census, it had a population of 3,763, making it the second-least populous county in Illinois. Its county seat is Golconda. The county was organized in 1816 from portions of Gallatin and Johnson counties and named after Nathaniel Pope, a politician and jurist from the Illinois Territory and State of Illinois.

History
The first permanent settlement in future Pope County was established in 1798 at the modern-day site of Golconda, then a part of the Northwest Territory which operated as a ferry point across the Ohio River. The county was formed in 1816 from portions of Gallatin and Johnson Counties.

Geography

The entire county is hilly and during rainy weather rivulets cascade down the hills in the park forming waterfalls of varying sizes and heights. The county contains Dixon Springs State Park, one of many state parks in the Illinois Shawnee Hills, and is part of the Shawnee National Forest. It is bordered to the south and east by the Ohio River, which marks the state's border with Kentucky.

Climate and weather

Major highways
  Illinois Route 34
  Illinois Route 145
  Illinois Route 146
  Illinois Route 147

Adjacent counties
 Saline County - north
 Hardin County - east
 Livingston County, Kentucky - southeast
 Massac County - southwest
 Johnson County - west
 Williamson County - northwest

National protected area
 Shawnee National Forest (part)

Demographics

As of the 2010 census, there were 4,470 people, 1,829 households, and 1,209 families living in the county. The racial makeup of the county was 91.7% white, 6.0% black or African American, 0.6% American Indian, 0.2% Asian, 0.5% from other races, and 0.9% from two or more races. Those of Hispanic or Latino origin made up 1.4% of the population. In terms of ancestry, 31.8% were German, 19.1% were Irish, 11.4% were English, and 5.4% were American.

Of the 1,829 households, 23.9% had children under the age of 18 living with them, 53.9% were married couples living together, 7.8% had a female householder with no husband present, 33.9% were non-families, and 29.8% of all households were made up of individuals. The average household size was 2.23 and the average family size was 2.72. The median age was 46.6 years.

The median income for a household in the county was $39,672 and the median income for a family was $51,500. Males had a median income of $45,865 versus $28,519 for females. The per capita income for the county was $20,134. About 6.6% of families and 12.4% of the population were below the poverty line, including 18.4% of those under age 18 and 9.1% of those age 65 or over.

Politics
In its early days Pope County, being strongly Southern in its culture and opposed to Northern Illinois, was powerfully Democratic, giving a majority to that party in every pre-war Presidential election.
 
However, during the Civil War, under the influence of Congressman John A. Logan, this region of dubious initial loyalty was to provide a number of Union soldiers rivalled on a per capita basis only by a few fiercely Unionist counties in Appalachia.
 
Stephen A. Douglas in 1860 remains the last Democrat to win a majority of the county's vote, although Bill Clinton won pluralities in both 1992 and 1996 due to Ross Perot siphoning votes from Republican opponents George Bush senior and Bob Dole. Hillary Clinton in 2016 fared extremely poorly, carrying fewer than eighteen percent of Pope County's votes.

Communities

City
 Golconda

Village
 Eddyville

Unincorporated communities
 Allens Spring
 Bay City
 Brownfield
 Dixon Springs
 Glendale
 Hamletsburg
 Herod
 Homberg
 Lusk's Ferry
 McCormick
 New Liberty
 Rising Sun

Notable people
 James Lusk Alcorn (1816-1894), born near Golconda, American Civil War general in the  Confederate Army
 John R. Hodge (1893-1963), born in Golconda; Military Governor of South Korea preceding the Korean War and Commanding General of the U.S. Third Army
 C. L. McCormick (1919-1987), born in McCormick, Illinois state representative and businessman
 Green B. Raum (1820-1909), born in Golconda, American Civil War general in the Union Army
 James A. Rose (1850-1912), born in Golconda, Illinois Secretary of State
 Mason Ramsey (2006-), born in Golconda, star of viral video “Walmart Kid Singing” and country singer

See also
 Dixon Springs State Park
 Ku Klux Klan in Southern Illinois
 National Register of Historic Places listings in Pope County
 Ohio River
 Shawnee National Forest

References

External links
 http://genealogytrails.com/ill/pope/cohist.htm
 http://www.fs.fed.us/r9/forests/shawnee

 
Illinois counties
1816 establishments in Illinois Territory
Populated places established in 1816
Illinois counties on the Ohio River
Pope County, Illinois
Pre-statehood history of Illinois